American singer-songwriter and actress Madonna has incorporated in her works abundant references of religious themes of different religions and spiritual practices, including Christianity (she was raised Catholic), Hinduism, Buddhism, Sufism, and Kabbalah. Several theologians, sociologists of religion and other scholars have reviewed her, while professor Arthur Asa Berger stated that she has raised many questions about religion. Due to her prominent use, an academic described her as "perhaps the first artist of our time to routinely and successfully employ images from many spiritual cultures and multiple religious traditions". 

Madonna's onstage representations of religions, provocative statements, behavior, among other things, attracted  criticism of religious institutions from major religious groups, including the Vatican State/Catholic Church. A handful of clergies, however, reacted with sympathetic views. Various religious adherents staged protests against Madonna numerous times, while she was often accused of sacrilege, heresy, iconoclasm and blasphemy. Madonna herself, has claimed she believes in Jesus but not in institutional organizations. 

While the phenomenon goes beyond Madonna, she received solid reviews discussing her religious forays with her ambiguous impact and influence in popular culture across several decades. She was credited with inspiring various scholars from different fields to seek new approaches for works and its religious meanings. Madonna was among the leading public figures often considered an important medium for popularizing ancient spiritual traditions in her generation such as Kabbalah studies or yoga. She became a noticeable trope for the word "icon", according to authors like semiotician Marcel Danesi, with her name appearing in reference works such as the Oxford Advanced Learner's Dictionary or Diccionario panhispánico de dudas to illustrate its new usage in contemporary culture. Outside religious world, views about Madonna's religious forays varying with different degrees as well, including moderate and conservative perspectives. Illustrating her polarization, some have referred to Madonna as "The Holy Mother of Pop", while Seventh-day Adventist magazine Sings of the Times recalls that some have adopted an alienated view of Madonna as the "Great Whore of Babylon".

Critical scope 

Shortly after her debut in the 1980s, various cultural analyses of her figure touched on Madonna's religious connotations. Various of them were categorized under her academic mini-subdiscipline, the Madonna studies, which flourished with other topics, according to observers such as Andi Zeisler, Douglas Kellner and Ricardo Baca. Author and professor Thomas Ferraro notes this early stage, saying "Madonna's impact posed an expressly religious puzzle". She also became a "favorite topic" for religious fundamentalists in her prime. According to editors of Religion and Popular Culture (2016), her video "Like a Prayer" inspired "perhaps more than any other music video scholarly analysis of its religious meanings". On the other hand, other religious studies scholars, like James R. Lewis, have explored Madonna's figure from perspectives that included astrology. 

It has also attracted media attention and headlines through the best part of career. In 2018, Cady Lang from Time, commented that there are few figures more closely associated with religion in pop culture than Madonna. Her long-standing relationship with the Catholic Church was noted by publications including Huron Daily Tribune, with Phoenix New Times describing it as a "synonymous with each other" in 2015. Vanity Fair called it a "famously complicated relationship". In 2010, Time magazine included Madonna's moments in their "Top 10 Vatican Pop-Culture Moments"; a rank that shows how the Roman Catholic Church mixed with contemporary culture.

Madonna's religious profile 
Madonna's religious background and public display have been extensively detailed.

Catholicism 

Madonna is an Italian-American born and raised Catholic, in a Roman tradition. She adopted "Veronica" as her confirmation name, paying tribute to Saint Veronica. 

Agents like the American theologian Chester Gillis, have explained that Madonna was educated in a strict Catholic household. It influenced both her life and career, with scholar Arthur Asa Berger recalling "the importance of her Italian Catholic background". In 1991, Christian author Graham Cray, wrote for Third Way that Madonna was the only lapsed Catholic in popular music who "has made a reaction against her Catholic background, in her driving force" and as a "motivation of her work". Years later, however, French academic Georges-Claude Guilbert commented that "her resentment toward Catholicism is proportional to the marks it left on her", but he didn't feel it as "particularly original", because many writers and artists built entire careers on such ambivalent feelings. To American philosopher Mark C. Taylor, "Madonna's ongoing involvement with Catholicism is exceedingly complex".

Spiritual seeking 
Madonna made a major turn in the mid-1990s during her pregnancy. She began practicing yoga and reading spiritual developments coming from Asia such as Hinduism and Buddhism. She also became a Kabbalah devotee. However, she kept her Christian education, revealing that her daughter Lourdes, "will spend more time with the Bible than her television". Religious professor Kathryn Lofton, said that her turn to Kabbalah "inspired articles emphasizing her new spiritual enthusiasm". Even Erik Davis, considered her case "the biggest metaphysical blast" in a 1999 article for Spin, where he reviewed industry's artists that incorporated or practiced spiritual beliefs. Commentators Craig Detweiler and Barry Taylor called it a "notable turn" in her life, impacted by motherhood, yoga, Kabbalah and Hindu mysticism.

Madonna later adopted the name "Esther", a Biblical Hebrew name that means "star". Shalom Goldman, a Middlebury College professor of religion, quotes Madonna as having claimed to have studied all the women of the Old Testament but she was most drawn to Esther because "she saved the Jews of Persia from annihilation". Some considered the name's choice as a "manifestation of the divine shekhinah" which in Kabbalah denotes the feminine aspect of God's presence. Rabbi Kerry M. Olitzky made the suggestion that Open Source Judaism, was what allowed Madonna to develop an interest in Kabbalah without any interest in converting to Judaism.

After her introduction to the Kabbalah studies, Madonna assisted for years to the Kabbalah Centre in Los Angeles, introduced by her friend Sandra Bernhard. The Centre attracted several Hollywood celebrities from Elizabeth Taylor to Britney Spears, but Madonna attracted "bigger headlines" according to Los Angeles Times journalists Harriet Ryan and Kim Christensen. In 2011, Reuters explored Madonna's crucial role for Centre's rise, with an insider stating: "Everything changed once Madonna began to study". The Centre was "widely associated with its famous member, Madonna" wrote Katherine Stewart. In Jewish Mysticism and Kabbalah (2011), Madonna was described as their most important follower, as she drew "extraordinary publicity to the Kabbalah Centre and induced many people to explore its offering". British author Harry Freedman also called her "the most prominent" Centre's devotee. According to American scientist Peter Gleick, she also made famous their "Kabbalah water". 

Into the 2010s, it remained unclear if Madonna kept studying Kabbalah or if she still an active member of the Centre. In 2017, a Vice contributor explained that many celebrities, stopped attend the Centre or studying Kabbalah. In 2011, British tabloid Daily Mirror and other media outlets, reported that Madonna considered joining Opus Dei. Editor Pedro Marrero expressed in 2020, that she has been a spiritual woman who has always sought God. American director Mary Lambert describes that "Madonna is a very religious person in her own way". Madonna herself, told Terry Wogan, in a 1991 interview, "I'm spiritual, religious". By 2022, she declared that spends some of her time praying for other people. She reportedly prays before a stage show, and for what academic Akbar Ahmed called Madonna, the "pop philosopher of postmodernist culture" in the 1990s.

Madonna's religious views, and authors interpretations 

Besides her spiritual seeking, Madonna has made several statements about religion, and specific denominations. "So many critics seem to love to discuss Madonna's obsession with religion", wrote Fosca D'Acierno in The Italian American Heritage (1998). In this regard, Anne-Marie Korte from Utrecht University, wrote that "religion plays a major role in Madonna's statements and provocations". Author Donald C. Miller, said "she has made very strong verbal and nonverbal statements". 

In 2015, in an interview with the Irish Independent, she stated: "I don't affiliate myself with any specific religious group. I connect to different ritualistic aspects of different belief systems, and I see the connecting thread between all religious beliefs". In 2016, she stated that her use of Christian imagery "is just proof of her devotion to Catholicism". She had also criticized their system, saying Catholicism "it's not what God and Christianity are all about".

Canadian professor of religious studies, Aaron W. Hughes, in Defining Judaism: A Reader (2016), interprets that "for Madonna, religion in general and Judaism in particular are inherently divisive and this divisiveness is ultimately responsible for the problems we face". Korte was critical, saying that "Madonna's interest in religion has never been theologically focused: it consists of a combinations of distrust towards institutional religion and an eclectic individual form of spirituality". Catholic author Christopher West, believes that "her reflections on her religious upbringing echo the sentiments of a large swath of the population". 

In Fill These Hearts (2013), West quotes Madonna supporting Jesus as a divine being, who walked on the Earth, but she rejects "the religious behavior of any religious organization that does not encourage you to ask questions and your own explorations". Similarly, Christian author Dan Kimball wrote in They Like Jesus but Not the Church (2009), that "Madonna doesn't find anything wrong with the teachings of Jesus" but doesn't believe that "all paths lead to God", citing the problem of religious war.

Implementation in her works 

Religion has influenced Madonna's artistic path; she frequently incorporates religious iconography and themes of different denominations into her visuals and works. Cath Martin of Christian Today, wrote she "blurred the lines between art and her own take on religion". Due to her abundant usage, Conrad Ostwalt, a religious studies scholar at Appalachian State University, wrote in Secular Steeples (2012): "Perhaps the most interesting pop star whose work touches upon and implicates religious themes is Madonna".

Catholic iconography has been Madonna's constant. She is credited with even popularizing the cross in pop music as a decorative object, which she uses in her shows and videos. Martin commented that her love affair with the cross "has spanned her music career". As her career continued, she involved Kabbalistic motives in her work and reportedly refused to work on Friday night and Saturday, as a result in her observance of the Jewish Sabbath. Religious Jewish symbols and Hebrew letters featured in some of her works, and Madonna was seen numerous times, with the red string around her wrist to ward off the evil eye, a trendy practice among celebrities during Bush era. Among her many other religious references, she included sufism themes. 

Madonna often received critics from the community for her provocative implementation of religious in her works. In 2023, she reflected her work as an "artist united people, gave them freedom of expression, unity. It was the mirror of Jesus' teachings", in her understanding. She once also stated about her usage of crosses:

Critical observations

A number of theologians noted the abundant use of female religious imagery by Madonna. She has played with female characters and roles from the Christian faith tradition. In The Virgin in Art (2018), Kyra Belán, wrote that she in particular has appropriated of the Virgin Mary, perhaps more than other artist. Feminist theologian Grietje Dresen, argues that Madonna seems to have incorporated very well her Roman Catholic education, in which the beauty, purity, and self-control of the 'immaculate' Virgin Mary are presented to girls as the standard of perfection.

Madonna herself, addressed from her religious education: "I grew up with two images of women, the virgin and the whore". Author and professor Thomas Ferraro, cites celebrities such Mario Puzo and Frank Sinatra as examples of an "Italian pagan" Catholic understanding of power, but he claims Madonna "gave it" a "long-awaited" and much "needed" female valence. On the other hand, her mispronunciation for the astangi in Ray of Light earned criticism of Hindu priests in Benaras and also intrigued some Sanskrit scholars.

Religious leadership reactions 

Madonna has received criticism from religious organizations and leaders of different denominations, over the best part of her career. "Madonna has a particular distinction of enraging a variety of religious leaders", wrote Purchase College professor Steven C. Dubin. Alone her 2006 onstage crucifixion, attracted criticism from Christian, Muslim and Jewish leaders. About that event, San Francisco Examiner staffers, said "only Madonna could get Muslim, Jewish and Catholic leaders to agree on something". American philosopher Mark C. Taylor noted Madonna revived a similar longstanding criticism of rock and roll, that led representative of the religions charge Madonna as a demonic.

In escalated situations, organizations and leaders tried to censure or boycott Madonna.

Christianity

The Vatican State and Popes of her generation condemned numerous of Madonna's acts. During the late-twentieth century, the Catholic Church opposed her Italian show of the Who's That Girl Tour in 1987, her advertisement with Pepsi in 1989, the Blond Ambition Tour in 1990 or for her first book Sex, in 1992. Organizations related to the Church, such as the Episcopal Conference of Italy criticized Madonna, and tried to ban her concerts. A parish priest from the organization, denounced Madonna as "an infidel and sacrilegious".

She continued to attract disapproval from the Catholic Church in the early years of the 21st century. Vatican representatives questioned her forays with the Kabbalah. With her Confessions Tour, Madonna garnered a major backlash for her segment when she appeared crucified on a giant cross in the countries where the tour was scheduled. Ersilio Tonini speaking with the approval of Pope Benedict XVI, commented "she should be excommunicated". In the 2010s, she was condemned with her Rebel Heart Tour by senior bishops like Patric Dunn from New Zealand, who commented, "There is no question in my mind that some of Madonna's material is highly offensive to Christianity and will be found just as offensive to the majority of people of religious faith", while Singaporean prelate William Goh commented, "There is no neutrality in faith". 

Other leaders and groups from Christian denominations, such as the Baptist Church, have criticized her in addition to the Catholic Church. Ghanaian religious leader Opoku Onyinah described thus "instead yielding to Christian principles, she decided to rebel against everything Christianity stands for". Vsevolod Chaplin from the Russian Orthodox Church, says "I'm absolutely sure that this person needs spiritual assistance" further adding "It's definitely clear for me that all these attempts to use religious symbols also reflect her state of mind and state of soul". American Baptist pastor Jerry Falwell and other conservative Christians leaders found Madonna's wearing religious symbols "trivializing" and "blasphemous" as well. In The Extermination of Christianity: A Tyranny of Consensus (1993) by clerics Paul Schenck and Rob Schenck, her usage of Christian imagery is described as obviously designed to raise the ire of the religious community, twice molesting them by using them as a free promotion.

Other denominations 
Madonna attracted the displeasure of Hindu and Jews spiritual leaders. Orthodox rabbis also concerned about Madonna, denouncing her for debasing Judaism's deepest mystical tradition, while accusing her of breaking taboos in Kabbalah. Professors of religious studies, Eugene V. Gallagher and Lydia Willsky-Ciollo explained in New Religion (2021), that the Jewish Kabbalah is typically exclusively men and rabbis by trade, but celebrities such as Madonna have taken up the practice under new guise; as a result, both Madonna and Kabbalah Centre attained some criticisms by this conduit. Rabbi Yisrael (Israel) Deri, caretaker of Isaac Luria's tomb (founder of Kabbalah), commented "this kind of woman wreaks an enormous sin upon the Kabbalah". Chief Rabbi of Safed (the birthplace of the Kabbalistic tradition), Shmuel Eliyahu in a open letter to Madonna, pointed out that her performances and public behavior were not in keeping with the values of the practice, "the enchanting wisdom you have so much respect for". Rabbi Yitzchak Schochet strongly objected to Madonna's use of the Kabbalah, arguing that it tarnishes Judaism when people who do not observe Jewish law practice Jewish mysticism. A prominent Jewish rabbi from London, also rebuked her practice of Kabbalah.

Jewish leaders condemned a version of "Justify My Love" that incorporated a passage from the Book of Revelation. Rabbi Abraham Cooper blasted the song as dangerous and was worried that fuel antisemitism. Others panned her video "Die Another Day", in which she bound phylacteries to her arm, a Jewish custom usually reserved for men. Madonna enrages Jewish leaders again with the song "Isaac" from her album Confessions on a Dance Floor.

Sympathetic views 

A handful of religious leaders were sympathetic or neutral towards Madonna's acts, and her artistic representation with religion. Some in the Catholic Church supported it, as British author Lucy O'Brien documented with her artistic crucifixion in 2006. According to Jesuit priest Carlos Novoa, writing for El Tiempo, her crucifixion "is not a mockery of the cross, but rather the complete opposite: an exaltation of the mystery of death". Others like Georges-Claude Guilbert brought the example of Catholic priest Andrew Greeley who "embraced" and "defended" her in the late 1980s. "My personal opinion is that Madonna is an artist and, like most artists, uses her experience and understanding of her culture in her work", Presbyterian minister Glenn Cardy said in 2016. Sun Ho, a Singaporean Christian pastor and former singer, praised Madonna's music contribution in the field of dance music.

In Seeker Churches (2000), author addressed the fact that "seeker church pastors tend to be more sympathetic in their analysis of Madonna's misguided quest for personal fulfillment", as pastor Lee Strobel suggests that Madonna's main problem is neither her "almost sacrilegious use of religious symbols" nor her "morally objectionable behavior", but instead that "she seeks fulfillment in all the wrong places". John W. Frye, citing Strobel in Jesus the Pastor (2010), said his models of teaching move toward "compassion" as in What Jesus Would Say, Strobel "imagines Jesus speaking to Madonna". According to Goldman, some traditional rabbis tolerated Madonna's brand of Kabbalism.

Public reaction 
Amid different interpretation of what religion is, Madonna's artistic representations of religion, and statements have the public reacted with varying degrees, even among devotees itself.

Religious community

Christian community has been described as the religious sector most offended by Madonna. According to Guilbert, in his 2002 Madonna biography, she has been punished by the religious right, such as televangelists and Puritans throughout the years. That sentiment was described by American author Boyé Lafayette De Mente: "millions regarded" her as an anti-Christ because "she is frequently profaning religious symbols". According to American journalist Christopher Andersen, at some stage of her career, she was "across the globe [...] being condemned as a heretic". Catholic priest Andrew Greeley, in The Catholic Myth (1997), summed up that for her detractors, "it is because she has contaminated religion with sex that Madonna must be condemned". According to Seventh-day Adventist magazine Sings of the Times, some have adopted an alienated view of Madonna as the Great Whore of Babylon.

Several Madonna concerts were condemned by prosecutors and religious adherents, including radical Orthodox believers who staged anti-Madonna protests. Alone with her 1993 Girlie Show, Plinio Corrêa de Oliveira, a Brazilian traditional Catholic activist reported protests and "rebuff" in countries such Germany and Argentina. She angered many Polish religious adherents in various of her stops when she toured. According to Evangelical Times during her Dutch stop of the Confessions Tour, police arrested a 63-year-old priest who admitted to making a hoax call in an attempt to disrupt the event. A bomb threat was also reported. 

In 2005, Reuters also informed: She "[...] has drawn frequent censure from ultra-Orthodox Jews who say her embrace of Kabbalah debases their religion". Some of them deemed Madonna as a "depraved cultural icon".

Several religious-targeted publications have written about Madonna's works and her persona. In the 1986 book What about Christian Rock?, authors compared how the religious press called Christian singer Sheila Walsh "sexy", while labeling "porn queen Madonna 'born again'". They also commented on the nickname given to Amy Grant (the "Madonna of Christian Rock"), explaining that other publications picked it up, but when it appeared in the religious press, it offended many Christian readers. "Like a Prayer" topped Religion News Service's 2013 ranking of the "10 'blasphemous' pop songs and music videos". In 2015, Susan Wills of the Catholic website Aleteia stated that Saint Hildegard of Bingen's reputation and fan base "continue to grow eight centuries after her death" and asked, "Does anyone think that will be the case with Madonna?". Susan, and David Mills from the same publication, reviewing her works in 2015, deemed them "so last century" or "so 1980s". 

After her 2006 Confessions Tour, professor and Catholic author Christine Whelan, wrote an article for Busted Halo (Paulist Fathers), in which ask their readers: "Do I have to go to confession for attending Madonna's Confessions tour?". She received answers from some of them. On January 2023, Madonna sparked outrage among Christians after doing an all-female Last Supper photoshoot, and also for channeling Virgin Mary as Our Lady of Sorrows, on the first Vanity Fairs European "Icon issue". The European Conservative headlined, that her photoshoots "Reveals Deep Occult Roots of the Entertainment Industry".

Moderate views: Jock McGregor, a contributor to the evangelical organization L'Abri  commented that "not all Christians have been hostile" towards Madonna. McGregor, himself, considered dedicating a few words to Madonna because she is "a significant and representative child of her times". Anglican British writer, Karl Dallas commented at some point that "so far she has done little more than to use the talents God gave her, and challenged a few sensibilities with them". Professor of religion Donna Freitas, and also a Christian adherent, gave a positive commentary to her crucifixion, interpreting "she is performing a woman's right to stand in Jesus's place".

Theological, academic, layman and other responses

Simultaneous reactions were made by theologians, and other observers.

In Stealing My Religion: Not Just Any Cultural Appropriation (2022), her usage of Catholic aesthetics is understood as an appropriation "to promote her brand". Academic Anne-Marie Korte, similarly states she uses Christian symbols and misuses them to attract attention while showing disrespect for Christian and for religion in general. Commenting about her  crucifixion performance in 2006, Lutheran theologian Margot Käßmann was critical, saying "to put oneself in the place of Jesus is an extraordinary manifestation of an inflated ego".  

Over years, others have made different interpretations, from a free speech support to more sympathetic views. English academic Katie B. Edwards proposes that "it might be argued that Madonna's use of religious symbols as entertainment is the reason she attracts the strong disapproval of religious institutions". However, she believes "the problem appears to lie more with Madonna's sexuality and the ways in which she uses it during her performances". Media scholar John Fiske once felt and stated that her uses of religious iconography are neither religious nor sacrilegious. Writing for Belfast Telegraph in 2008, Gail Walker brought the scandals that Catholic Church have rocked into comparative, to further express that her "musings on the simple icons of her culture seem more a positive recognition of the emotional power of Christianity than ridicule of it".

In the late-twentieth century, American journalist Pete Hamill even considered her "a good Christian". Behaviorally speaking, in Profiles of Female Genius (1994), editor asserts that "if nothing else, she is honest" with her reflection, making a comparison that "she may be offensive to the Church and appear sacrilegious to most people, but she is more honest than many women seen walking the streets of the world with crucifixes". Journalists Andrew Breitbart and Mark Ebner called Madonna, the "Mother Superior of perpetual self-indulgence". After the release of "Like a Prayer", some religious liberals defended Madonna as a martyr to free speech. Other theologians defended her representations, including her 2006 stage crucifixion, calling a "contribution to feminist theology and liberation theology". Less impressive has been Marcella Althaus-Reid, a contextual theology professor, adopting Madonna's song to refer on materialistic and divine concepts embodied within theological discourses saying: "We are all material theologians living in a material world".

Outside Christian world, some Hindu scholars backed Madonna, including Vagish Shastri after the criticism she faced by religious organizations like World Vaisnava Association with her performance at MTV in 1998.

Metaphor of cult following

Parallel to religious followers' disagreement on Madonna, her figure was a trope for counter-analogous ways, touching the cult status contours. "A figure as disturbing as she is sacred", commented Olivier Bouchara from Vanity Fair France in 2023. The editors of Cassell's queer companion (1995), state that "her remarkable influence [...] is testified by the fact she inspires either intense devotion or revulsion in practically everybody". Broadly speaking, authors of Global Perspectives on Sports and Christianity (2017), explained that in the literature of fandoms, studiers use religious metaphors, as a fan club could be considered a modern and secularized version of a religious group. In The Family, Civil Society, and the State (1998), an insider said "devotion to Madonna and the madonna must be seen as exertions of the same right".

From that analogy, American journalist Ricardo Baca commented in 2008, that for some, Madonna is a "divine creation"—an otherworldly gift to the masses in the form of an incessantly morphing entity who's been steering [...] religious trends [...] for the last 25 years. E. San Juan Jr. cited a biographer who reported in the early 1990s, "millions pray at the altar of Madonna, Our Lady of Perpetual Promotion". In her 2019 novel Tuesday Mooney Talks to Ghosts: An Adventure, Kate Racculia refers to "the altar of Our Lady Madonna Louise of Ciccone", thus telling part of the story of "Dex". Film director David Fincher once described his bond with the singer: "Madonna is my Vatican, she's my Sistine Chapel". Writing for The Guardian in 2010, author Wendy Shanker called Madonna as her guru. She described herself as a fan and not fanatic. In The Power of Madonna, character Sue Sylvester "looks up to Madonna more than any other person, concept, or deity".

Other secularized nicknames were applied. Art historian Kyra Belán explains in The Virgin in Art (2018), that for some, Madonna is "The Holy Mother of Pop", and she adds she "still continuously reinventing and revealing herself in many mundane, divine, mysterious and Madonna-ish ways", while Nick Levine, headlined her in a 2019 Vices article, as the "Holy Mother of Modern Pop". Professor Abigail Gardner commenting in 2016, said "she has been referred to as a modern pop goddess". Back in 1998, Ann Powers also said she has been designated as a "secular goddess" by audience and pundits. Indeed, La Vanguardia staffers, in the 2015 article, "Madonna: Our Lady of Pop", named her as the "first global goddess of pop". In 2016, Bellevue University psychology professor, Cleveland Evans, called her the "high priestess of pop", and Julián Ruiz in El Mundo called her "Our Lady".

Cultural concerns and discussions 

Due a solid popularity, Madonna's forays with religion imposed cultural concerns over decades among the community. Authors Peter Levenda and Paul Krassner concurred that probably no person of the 1980s and 1990s in the American popular culture represents better the conflicting spiritual forces that Madonna. "Some of the most important and interesting texts in recent U.S. culture which have overlapping concerns with liberations theologies are by Madonna", wrote religious scholar Mark D. Hulsether, in Bruce Forbes's Religion and Popular Culture in America. Academic Akbar Ahmed commented that in the cases of Rushdie and Madonna, "numerous overlapping national, intellectual and cultural boundaries are being crossed". 

In 2002, H. T. Spence from Foundations Bible College, decried that although the world has written her up as being very philosophical and theological in her presentation, "she is the factual commentary that America has come to a cultural illiteracy". Stephen Prothero, put Madonna in context of his interpretation in Religious Literacy (2009), that "many cannot recognize the phrase 'Hail, Mary', except as the name of a football play", and that many are "unaware that the pop singer Madonna was actually named after someone". In Madonna as Postmodern Myth (2002), French academic Georges-Claude Guilbert captures and perceived a related feeling by saying, "today, America knows more about Madonna than about any passage of the Bible". Sociologist Bryan Turner, reviewed Ahmed's words and his emphasis on Madonna saying:

Madonna also became one of the Hollywood celebrities that attracted concerns from authors about her spiritual forays. For example, British commentator Melanie Phillips, said that Madonna, Cherie Blair and Princess Diana represent the rise of what Christopher Partridge has termed "occulture". Robert Wuthnow, a studier of sociology of religion, described in Creative Spirituality: The Way of the Artist (2003): "At worst, artists' spirituality is reduced to the commercial exploits of pop-singer Madonna or the cultic followings of the Grateful". In Mediating Faiths (2016), Joy Kooi-Chin Tong wrote that Madonna, Microsoft and McDonald's, represented a "fierce competition" for religious leaders in Singapore to retain their followers' loyalty. Following the release of "Justify My Love", there was a report of graffiti in at least three synagogues and a high school in Ventura County, California, using the phrase "synagogue of Satan" (Revelations 2:9).

Israeli visits and role within Kabbalah studies 
Madonna concerned Israelis and Palestines, during a massive infiltration of the Kabbalah into the public eye.

Madonna attended a Kabbalah lecture in the Holy Land, Israel during the 2004 Jewish New Year. Her decision to visit Rachel's Tomb was criticized by pro-Palestinian activists, and some protests were made. Agence France-Presse (AFP), informed that she raised questions over the nature of her faith. Professor Goldman, commented she received an overwhelming amount of media and government attention, resulting in "unforeseen diplomatic consequences". As a result, Egypt banned Madonna from visiting their country. In an article for The Guardian, Chris McGreal described how Orthodox men chanted shabbos while others yelled at her to go home, accusing Madonna of desecrating their religion. The Jewish agency International Society for Sephardic Progress requested to Yitzhak Kaduri —the maximun authority of Kabbalah in his time— refuse to bless the singer. Kaduri flatly refused to see Madonna on her pilgrimage to Israel. 

The media were also divided. The Jerusalem Post described her as "an open philo-Semite who has done more than many Jews". Giving Madonna and her embrace of Kabbalah the benefit of the doubt, the Post staff declared: "Perhaps Madonna will lead some Jews and others astray and give a rich and sophisticated branch of Judaism a bad name. Perhaps, however, some of the many Jews and others who seek spirituality and community in other quarters, such as Eastern religions, will be inspired to explore what Judaism has to offer". An English-language program in Safed, claimed "Madonna happened to be a vehicle for God". American-born Israeli journalist Yossi Klein Halevi, wrote that for some Jews, "Madonna's endorsement of Jewish mysticisms helps make Judaism attractive to alienated young Jews". 

Overall, her public role within the Kabbalah studies earned her criticism. Scholars from the University of Northern Iowa criticized Madonna for turning the multi-thousand year old religious study into entertainment. British commentator Melanie Phillips described Madonna as an icon of Western modernity and the world's most famous proponent of Kabbalah, which she argues is a modern perversion of a branch of Jewish mysticism.

Other Madonna visits to Israel for her Kabbalah agenda were reported, but with no major concerns. She was reportedly visit again the country in 2007. 

Rabbi Kerry M. Olitzky believes that her interest in one form of Jewish philosophy spilled over into advocacy for the land of Israel. In 2009, Madonna wrote an article for Yedioth Ahronoth discussing Jewish faith. In positive cultural effects, Madonna's visits to Israel in the 2000s, favored country's tourism at that time. Rabbi Olitzky, noted that her 2004 visit was during the Second Intifada, a time when few were visiting Israel. Sylvan Adams, the Israeli-Canadian billionaire who brought Madonna to the 2019 Eurovision Song Contest, expected the same as in previous years.

Madonna and dichotomy 

British academic Helen Weinreich-Haste once noted Madonna's mix of religion and sexuality, saying that "much has been written about her subversive effect on middle-class and Catholic values. She is one of the world's first  performers to "manipulate the juxtaposition of sexual and religious themes", said business theorist Jamie Anderson. Donald C. Miller, considered is "something that set her apart from earlier female performers". 

In The Virgin in Art (2018), Kyra Belán felt that she "has successfully fused these antisexual archetypes and made them sexy, a feat not previously achieved by anyone else". Author of Transgressive Corporeality (1995), said that Madonna created "a religion of the simulacrum" by mocking the traditional meaning of the symbols of Catholicism, and reducing them to vehicles for the evocation of sexual feeling. Theologian Robert Goss was overall positive with Madonna's religious "rebellion", considering her even a "Christ icon", who "has dissolved the boundaries between queer culture and queer faith communities" (also known as gay religion). 

In Kabbalah and Modernity (2010), by professors of religious studies Boaz Huss, Kocku von Stuckrad and researcher Marco Pasi, it is stated that "from the beginning Madonna has presented herself as saint and virgin on the one hand, and as a sinner with inclination to promiscuity" and more that any other artist, Madonna plays with these roles and this way, most interpreters agree she is the "icon" of postmodern self-fashioning. Semiotician Marcel Danesi commented that "perhaps no one has come to symbolize the sacred vs. profane dichotomy more than Madonna". 

She inscribed her own view of sin exploring her sexuality and religious themes and it influenced others. For example, professor Peter Gardella, wrote in Innocent Ecstasy (2016), that "her music helped others to reach the same goal". Gardella, further quotes a professor of gender studies as saying: "It was also Madonna, leading her own sexual revolution, who made me realize that sex was not a sing, nor was it a bad thing, in spite of what the Catholic Church and my family thought". Miller, another supporter of these views, noted her early influence in a substantial number of teenage girls, as Madonna impacted not only their fashion, but their identities and influencing on their life goals and desires.

Other Madonna's acts were analyzed. M.C. Bodden, an early modern English professor at Jesuit institution, Marquette University, explored the "Madonna prayer" in the film Truth or Dare. Bodden suggested because that scene was replayed hundreds of times in different cities and countries, "Madonna has constituted a new identity for prayer", although it lacks of religiousness. Bodden further describes it as a "floating signifier" that follows what Baudrillard calls "four orders". Sociologist Bryan Turner, as is cited in Religious Commodifications in Asia: Marketing Gods (2007) illustrates:

Impact in popular culture 

American professor Arthur Asa Berger described that she has raised many questions about religion. The advent of music video "Like a Prayer" marked alone, to inspire "leading" cultural studies theorists, musicologists, and philosophers, from Susan McClary to Mark C. Taylor to explore new ways of addressing works' religious meanings.

Less impressed have been the authors who compared the influence of popular culture as a whole with a perceived decline of some religious ideologies, or particularly Catholicism, but put Madonna within the cultural industry. In Edward Said and the Religious Effects of Culture (2000), William David Hart, addressed Edward Said and Theodor W. Adorno perspectives of ideologies. He uses the singer, as many people know about her, but "have not a clue" about who the Sistine Madonna is. Joel Martin in Screening The Sacred (2018), also said that religion has become a simple one topic, and not a particularly one. He perceives that critics, seem to assume that religion has declined in importance in the modern age of advanced capitalism, and the critical action is elsewhere—with Madonna, not the madonna—. Graham Howes, a sociologist of religion, explored in The Art of the Sacred (2006), the "altered" meanings, describing "a strong case could be made for the dominant imagery of contemporary Western culture being neither primarily visual nor verbal but essentially audiovisual —the singer Madonna, rather than the madonna—. In Changing Fashion (2007), authors discussed while mentioned Madonna, that in value systems of modern culture, "nothing is sacred, everyhing is marketable".

Entertainment industry 

In 1999, Erik Davis considered Madonna as "just the top of the iceberg" in his description that "pop music has always percolated with weird religious energies". For British-Australian sociologist Bryan Turner, popular religion became a component in the industry and Madonna "is the most spectacular illustration of this process", he said. Australian music journalist Craig Mathieson, wrote for The Canberra Times that "it was Madonna who summed up the way pop music intertwines the secular and spiritual".

Cady Lang from Time stated in 2018, her "obsession with her Catholic upbringing has undeniably shaped both the pop culture and fashion landscape". "For the first time in mainstream culture", she brought religious symbolism into pop music, said Gail Walker from Belfast Telegraph. Stewart Hoover, a scholar of religious studies, asserts that Madonna "pushed new boundaries in bringing traditional religious imagery into the popular music context". Some perceived an influence on other entertainers; according to Nelson George, Blackout by Britney Spears "contains some direct Madonna references", with the CD booklet photo showing Spears sitting on a priest's lap. In decrying Gaga's mimicry of Madonna, Bill Donohue president of the US Catholic League acknowledges that "religious" symbolism already has an autonomous, secular system of meaning in popular culture. Catholic theologian Tom Beaudoin, whom described Madonna's "Like a Prayer" video as "irreverent spirituality", argues in Virtual Faith (1998) that "pop music has become the amniotic fluid of contemporary society. It is the place where we work out our spirituality".

Fashion

Lynn Neal, assistant professor of religious studies at Wake Forest University, wrote in Religion in Vogue (2019), that despite the criticism from the Christian community towards Madonna, others found her early rebellious stance to conservative religion and her juxtaposition of religious symbols with female sexuality "fashionable" and sought to emulate her style. In Consumption and Spirituality (2013), academic Linda M. Scott and the other authors, credited Madonna with initiating the trend of using religious emblems typically worn as objects of beauty. The Globe and Mails Nathalie Atkinson was critical, granting Madonna a major role because religious iconography became "subversive" for the masses since the 1980s, while her style infiltrated high fashion.

Madonna made a significant impact regarding the usage of crucifixes as a fashion item over years, with Christian writer Graham Cray describing in 1991, how "she has made the crucifix a fashion icon". Vogue Italias Laura Tortora, even thought Madonna was the first to wear crucifixes as fashion accessories. Neal mentioned previous examples, but they generated little comment and controversy in either the secular or religious press. Due to Madonna's popularity, Neal said "the most credit" for the popularity of cross jewelry could go to Madonna, further citing an industry insider, who said her cross "had a noticeable impact". Academics have documented the cross-shaped jewelry inspired by Madonna, might be understood as "a religious symbol that has overtaken the culture". Her massive appeal, and usage was controversial in her time; in 1985, minister Donald Wildmon called her "anti-Christian" and "antifamily" for wearing crucifixes as jewelry. Others accused her as "a source of moral contagion" to children and families. Revisiting the era, Stephanie Rosenbloom from The New York Times, wrote in her article Defining Me, Myself and Madonna (2005) how her commitment to Madonna, and not Roman Catholicism moved her to petition for a cross to her parents. Writing for Vanity Fair in 2019, Osman Ahmed, commented positively saying "many of today's" jewelers look to the magpie mash-up of the New Romantics and Madonna in her Like a Virgin phase. 

In 2004, BBC informed that after Madonna's use of red string, other celebrities followed suit, such as Britney Spears and Courtney Love. The red bracelet also saw a surge in sales, with Madonna having been an influence, although other adopters were Michael Jackson, Demi Moore and Lindsay Lohan.

Spiritual practices/traditions 
Associate professors in Religion and Popular Culture: Rescripting the Sacred (2016), explained that she has been giving credit for opening up new ways to experience and express spirituality and religion. In The Bloomsbury Handbook of Religion and Popular Music (2017) by Christopher Partridge and Marcus Moberg, Madonna is credited with ushering Indochic, and the resignifications of Hindu symbols like the bindi and henna, practices like yoga, meditation and the language Sanskrit as "fashionable and cool" in her generation.

Madonna was among the leading celebrities in popularize the Kabbalah studies. Karen Stollznow, an Australian writer commented that she made it "trendy" in Occident. Author Alison Strobel commented that "Madonna had popularized it to the point where it was simple to find a place to go learn". By 2015, American educator and theologian Robert E. Van Voorst remarked Internet searches for "Madonna" and "Kabbalah" returning more than 695,000 hits on February of that year, and which led him to conclude it "remains strong".

Other publications have particularly explored Madonna's role for bringing yoga to the masses in her generation; from The New York Times to Diario Sur, placing her on frontline compared to others. These sources have exemplified the previous stereotype associated with the subcultural group of hippies. While they were not pleased, in 2004 the Yoga Journal cited a program from E! in which yoga was understood as part of a counterculture and did not officially become a trend followed by the masses until Madonna took it up. In Women, Body, Illness (2003), Madonna is credited with popularizing Ashtanga Yoga as a way to blend spiritual awareness with body fitness. However, yoga guru Sadhguru, was overall critical about textbooks and other sources giving credit to figures like Madonna, and not Shiva (Adiyogi).

Meaning of "icon"

Madonna represented a meaningful road for the word "icon", of religious overtones, in popular culture usage. Universität Heidelberg professor of American literature, lumped Madonna with other three examples as "obvious" illustrations of "cultural icon", further citing Oxford English Dictionarys 2009 definition of "icon". "Thus, if researchers, journalists, or everyday conversationalists were to call [...] Madonna a cultural icon, they may not be saying just that she is a striking image but that as a culture, we have invested her with a sacred status that any of her images carry", wrote author of Sexualities and Popular Culture (1998).

In Language, Society, and New Media: Sociolinguistics by semiotician Marcel Danesi, is documented that the word "icon" is a "term of religious origin" and "arguably used for the first time in celebrity culture to describe the American pop singer Madonna". The following description asserts that this word is "now used in reference to any widely known celebrity, male or female". Madonna's name is even used as an illustration of its new meaning in reference works such as the Oxford Advanced Learner's Dictionary and Diccionario panhispánico de dudas. Having mentioned the case of Madonna, Guy Babineau from Xtra Magazine stated in 2008: "I'm old enough to remember when people weren't called icons".

Over years, while also mentioning Madonna and although some of them reacted no impressive, a number of scholars have illustrated how the word became more popular for cultural terms, instead of religion and art history, including Keyan Tomaselli and David H. T. Scott in Cultural Icons (2009), and authors of Handbook of Research on Consumption, Media, and Popular Culture in the Global Age (2019), where the analogy between Madonna and the Virgin Mary were compared.

Background and author interpretations

Danesi, said that calling Madonna an "icon" was also a result of the irony of her name. "Her face matches her name [...] she really look like a madonna", wrote the interviewer of arguably her first-ever press article (1978), from The Charlotte Observer.

Madonna "appeared as challenging twentieth-century image of an ancient icon", wrote Lucy O'Brien in Madonna: Like an Icon. In a similar connotation, professor Abigail Gardner wrote in Rock On (2016), "she has appeared as a modern incarnation of an ancient icon". Even, associate professor Diane Pecknold, in American Icons (2006), explored that "many contemporary observers contended that from the very beginning of her career, Madonna's main ambition was to become an icon and that pop music simply provided the most convenient avenue for attaining that goal". For Madonna, as Rodrigo Fresán quotes, an icon is when people start to unrealistically identify with them or hate for "all the wrong reasons". In the 1990s, scholar Camille Paglia called her an "important icon", while Rolling Stone staffers, named her a "living icon". In the mid-2010s, Naomi Fry copy chief of T: The New York Times Style Magazine deemed her the "most iconic of icons", and Erica Russell from MTV commented that she has both defined and redefined what it means to be an icon.

Depictions 

"Religion appears in popular culture and popular culture appears in religion", according to the editors of The Columbia Documentary History of Religion in America Since 1945 (2005). As reported medievalists Richard Utz and Jesse G. Swan, in The Year's Work in Medievalism, 2002, Madonna is mentioned in Supernatural Visions (1991), where she is described as "both the incorrigible Whore of Babylon and the simple sinner". In 2014, a group of Christians released the book Madonna's new age end time Satanism: A revelation. One of its authors, Stacey Dames, a self-declared former Madonna's fan and blogger from The Christian Post, devoted a same-titled article in 2012. Some media outlets referred to the group as Christian fanatics and Dames was called a "Madonna-obsessed". An assistant art professor from the University of Tampa, used Madonna and Elvis Presley in an Italian exhibition to show parallels between the Virgin Mary and Jesus respectively, and how popular culture "is becoming a religion for some people". 

Madonna was name-checked in some religious dialogues. Shaul Magid, a religious scholar, wrote in American Post-Judaism (2013), heard about rabbis in Reform and Conservative synagogues citing in their discourses Homer, Plato, Buddha, Muhammad, Gandhi, Martin Luther King Jr., the Dalai Lama and even Madonna. "This is as if we tried to enter into a dialogue with Catholics, and for this purpose we invite the Pope and pop star Madonna", echoed German academic Christian Joppke from a religious Muslim leader, objecting to the participation of feminist Muslim critics at the first German Islam Conference in September 2006.

Italian Ursuline nun, Sister Cristina made her musical debut in 2014, covering the song "Like a Virgin", as "a testimony of God's capacity to turn all things into something new". In an interview with Catholic daily L'Avvenire, she further expressed that she made it "without any intention of being provocative or scandalous", as well as applying spiritual variety. SIR, a news agency run by Italian Bishops, commented about Madonna posting a photo with the nun as a sign of endorsing Sister's cover, but they interpreted the image saying that Sister Cristina needs to be "careful" since her choice of cover can easily be "manipulated". She later gave a copy of her album to Pope Francis.

See also
"Illuminati" (Madonna song)
Madonna and contemporary arts

References

Book sources

External links 
Madonna — El Espectador (2023)
Mater Madonna — Diario de Sevilla (2023)
Unpacking Madonna’s Spiritual Beliefs — Focus on the Family (2015)
Madonna’s “Isaac”/Madonna’s Akeda—A lesson for scholars, old and young — The Immanent Frame by David Blumenthal (2015)
Give me back my old Madonna — The Guardian (2004)
Russians Confess They Want to See Madonna — Los Angeles Times (2006)
Madonna's Challenge to Her Church: From May 13, 1989 — American by Andrew Greeley (1989)

Madonna
Christianity in popular culture controversies
Criticism of Christianity
Religious controversies in music
Religious views by individual